The most basic rule of heraldic design is the rule of tincture: metal should not be put on metal, nor colour on colour (Humphrey Llwyd, 1568). This means that the heraldic metals or and argent (gold and silver, represented by yellow and white) should not be placed on each other, nor may any of the colours (i.e. azure, gules, sable, vert and purpure, along with some other rarer examples) be placed on another colour. Heraldic furs (i.e. ermine, vair and their variants) as well as "proper" (a charge coloured as it normally is in naturealthough that may be as defined by heralds) are exempt from the rule of tincture.

The rule seems to have operated from the inception of the age of heraldry, i.e. about 1200–1215, but seemingly was never written down. It was rather deduced by later commenters as a rule which must have existed, based on the evidence it produced. Although the vast majority of coats of arms ever used across the whole of Europe follow the rule, a very few coats which contravened the rule were borne in the mediaeval era by certain families or corporate bodies for many centuries without effective censure by the heraldic authorities. The reason for the original contraventions and for the toleration of them is unknown, although in the case of the arms of the Kingdom of Jerusalem, clearly extremely high status was involved.

Application
The main duty of a heraldic device is to be easily recognisable. Certain tincture pairs are difficult to distinguish when placed atop or over each other.  Specifically, a dark colour is very difficult to distinguish if it is placed on top of another dark colour, and likewise a light metal is very difficult to distinguish on top of the other light metal. Though this is the practical genesis of the rule, the rule is technical and appearance is not used in determining whether arms conform to the rule. Another reason sometimes given to justify this rule is that it was difficult to paint with enamel (colour) over enamel, or with metal over metal.

Lawful exceptions
The rule of tincture does not apply to furs, nor to charges blazoned "proper" (displayed in their natural colour, which need not be a normal heraldic tincture). The blazoning of a charge “proper” is not a loophole when its natural coloration equates to or approaches another heraldic tincture. When an animal, plant, weapon, or any other object appears in colours perceived to be their natural colours, they must always be blazoned as proper. Hugh Clark’s An Introduction to Heraldry states that “In the blazoning of charges, be they of what nature or kind soever, whether animate or inanimate, if you perceive them to be of the natural and proper colours of the creatures or things they represent, you must always term them proper, and not argent, or, gules, or by the like terms of this science.” As such, if the blazon for the historical coat of arms of Samogitia were to term the black bear as “a black bear proper,” a colour on colour violation would not exist by the bear appearing on a field gules. Another example would be a white horse proper, since without breaking the rule of no metal on metal it could be placed on a field Or (gold), but a horse argent (silver horse), although visually indistinguishable, could not.

Furs and charges blazoned as proper can be placed on colour, metal, fur, or charges blazoned as proper.

The rule of tincture does not apply, as well, when a charge is described in heraldic tinctures and those heraldic tinctures include both colour and metal. Fox-Davies wrote that “A charge composed of more than one tincture, that is, of a metal and colour, may be placed upon a field of either.” As such, while the coat of arms of Szczecin, Poland appears to violate the colour on colour rule, it instead adheres to the exceptions to the rule of tinctures – as long as the griffin’s head is blazoned proper, or it is blazoned in tinctures so that the arms (beak) are termed Or (gold), the charge may lawfully appear on a field of either colour or metal.

The rule of tincture does not apply in regards to the arms (claws and tongue) of beasts of prey, and presumably to the arms of birds of prey, as well. Fox-Davies wrote that “A lion rampant and any other beast of prey is usually represented in heraldry with the tongue and claws of a different colour from the animal. If it is not itself gules, its tongue and claws are usually represented as of that colour, unless the lion [or beast of prey] be on a field of gules. They are then represented azure, the term being ‘armed and langued’ of such and such a colour.” Hugh Clark’s An Introduction to Heraldry states the same, yet in more depth.

The rule of tincture does not apply when a colour which represents a metal in heraldry, such as white representing argent, is blazoned as the colour and not as the metal. Fox-Davies wrote that “the distinction between white and silver is marked, and a white label upon a gold lion is not metal upon metal.” The same is true of a white charge upon an argent charge, when blazoned as such, even though argent is depicted as white in heraldry.

Simple divisions of the field are considered to be beside each other, not one on top of the other; so the rule of tincture does not apply.  In practice, however, fields divided into multiple partitions, such as barry or checky, use (with extremely rare exceptions) an alternating pattern of metal and colour for adjacent units.

The rule also does not apply to charges placed upon party-coloured (divided) or patterned fields; a field party or patterned of a colour and metal may have a charge of either colour, metal, or party or patterned, placed on it (and there is a small body of precedent that a field party of two colours or two metals may have a charge or charges of either colour, metal, or party or patterned on it; examples of this certainly exist).  Likewise, a party-coloured (of colour and metal) charge may be placed on either a colour or metal background.  Neither does the rule apply to the tongue, horns, claws, hoofs of beasts (for instance, a lion Or on an azure field could be langued [with his tongue] gules) when of a different tincture than the rest of the animal, or other parts of charges that are "attached" to them; for instance, a ship sable on an Or field may have argent sails as the sails are considered to be attached on the ship rather than charged on the field.

One important distinction, according to Fox-Davies, is that the rule of tincture also does not apply to crests or supporters, except in such cases as the crest or supporter itself is treated as a field and charged with one or more objects. For instance, a gold collar about the neck of an argent supporter is common, but if eagle wings are used as a crest and charged with a trefoil (such as the coat of arms of Brandenburg), the trefoil must conform to the rule of tincture.

Another apparent violation that is not regarded as such is the "very uncommon" practice of a bordure of the same tincture of the field being blazoned as "embordured"; while well known in former times this is unusual in the extreme today.  How technical the rule is can be seen by the fact that if this were blazoned as Gules... a bordure of the field..., though of identical appearance, it would be considered a blatant violation.

The colours bleu celeste and the U.S. Institute of Heraldry-invented buff have sometimes been treated (with respect to the rule of tincture) as if they are metals, though such a treatment is certainly of debatable propriety.

Marks of cadency (whether bordures, the marks of the English cadency system, or any other mark), and presumably marks of distinction, can be exceptions to this rule.  For example, many members of the French royal house had a red border or bend against the blue field.  Also, in Great Britain, cantons added to indicate baronetcy of Ulster (argent, a hand couped gules) ignore this rule; otherwise they could be displayed by no one with a metal field.  Augmentations and abatements do not have to conform to the rule.

Another violation which is usually not worried about is a green mount on a blue field representing the sky, and some of the methods of depicting the sea, waves or the like are similarly treated.  A green trimount also appears in the coat of arms of Hungary (shown below). In this case the field is gules (red); the rule of tincture should therefore exclude this use of a vert (green) trimount. Instead, there is a trimount vert used in violation of the rule.  However, it has been argued by some that the mount vert or trimount issues from the base of the shield rather than being a charge on it, causing the rule not to apply.

Fimbriation, the surrounding of a charge by a thin border, can obviate what would otherwise be a violation of the rule, as in the Union Jack (which, although a flag rather than a shield, was designed using heraldic principles).  The divise, a thin band running underneath the chief in French heraldry, can also obviate a violation, as can the parallel fillet in English heraldry.

Violations
This rule is so closely followed that arms that violate it are called armes fausses (false arms) or armes à enquérir (arms of enquiry). Any violation is presumed to be intentional, to invite the viewer to ask how it came to pass.

Metal on metal
One of the most famous armes à enquérir (often erroneously said to be the only example) was the Jerusalem cross said to have been chosen by Godfrey of Bouillon in 1099 (pre-heraldic and thus strictly speaking attributed arms) and later used by his brother Baldwin of Boulogne when he was made King of Jerusalem. These attributed arms of "Argent, a cross potent between four plain crosslets or", displayed five gold crosses on a silver field. A use of metal on metal is also seen on the Bishop's mitre in the arms of Andorra and in the arms of the county of Trøndelag in Norway,  based on the arms of St. Olav as described in the Sagas of Snorri. It may indicate the exceptional holy and special status of this particular coat of arms.

Colour on colour

An example of "colour on colour" is the arms of Albania, with its two-headed eagle sable  on a field gules. However, some writers in Central and Eastern European heraldry consider sable to have properties of both a metal and a colour, not exclusively a colour as it is in Western Europe, so that black-on-colour combinations are not uncommon.

This rule is perhaps most often violated by a chief, leading some commentators to question whether the rule should apply to a chief, or even whether a chief should be considered a charge at all rather than a division of the field.  These violations usually occur in the case of landscape heraldry and augmentations.  French civic heraldry, with its frequent chiefs of France (i.e. "Azure, three fleurs-de-lys or", anciently "Azure, semée-de-lys or"), often violates this rule when the field is of a colour. The coat of arms appearing on the famous tapestry of The Lady and the Unicorn (Paris, c.1500) was attributed until now by specialistes to the older branch and to the chief of the family Le Viste, Jean IV Le Viste, but it blatantly breaks the rules of French Heraldry. A new study of the tapestry suggests the probability of the intervention of a descendant of the younger branch, Antoine II Le Viste, as a sponsor of the tapestry, and indicates that the incorrect superposition of colours could have been a mere difference. An example of a contravention from medieval England quoted by John Gibbon in 1682 is the arms of Denys of Siston, Gloucestershire, "Gules, three leopard's faces or jessant-de-lys azure over all a bend engrailed of the third".
A modern contravention of the rule is in the former arms of Harvard Law School, "Azure, a chief gules".

Cousu
In French heraldry, the term cousu ("sewn") is sometimes in blazon used to get around what would otherwise be a violation of the rule; though this is used generally, occasionally a distinction is drawn between the cousu of colour on colour and the soudé ("soldered") of metal on metal, though this has fallen from fashion to a large degree.

In Italian heraldry terms such as per inchiesta are used in the blazons of the extremely rare violations of the rule, to acknowledge their exceptionality or impropriety.

Modern design principle
The rule of tincture has had an influence reaching far beyond heraldry.  It has been applied to the design of flags, so that the flag of Saxe-Weimar-Eisenach was modified to conform to the rule. Pragmatically, it is a useful rule of thumb for the design of logos, icons and other symbols.

References

Sources
 Balfour Paul, James (1893). An Ordinary of Arms Contained in the Public Register of All Arms and Bearings in Scotland. William Green and Sons.
 Boutell, Charles and A. C. Fox-Davies (2003). English Heraldry. Kessinger Publishing. .
 Fox-Davies, Arthur Charles and Graham Johnston (1978). A Complete Guide to Heraldry. New York: Bonanza Books. .
 Heim, Bruno Bernard (1994). Or and Argent. Gerrards Cross, UK: Van Duren. .
 Llwyd of Denbigh, Humphrey (c1568). Dosbarth Arfau.
 Neubecker, Ottfried (1997). Heraldry: Sources, Symbols and Meaning. London: Tiger Books International. .
 Spener, Philip Jacob (1690). Insignium Theoria. Frankfurt. Library of Congress record.
 Woodcock, Thomas and John Martin Robinson (1988). The Oxford Guide to Heraldry. Oxford: Oxford University Press. .

External links

Techniques and principles related to heraldic tinctures